William Handy Onderdonk (March 5, 1820 – December 11, 1882) was an American lawyer from New York.

Life 
Onderdonk was born on March 5, 1820, in New York City, New York, the son of Bishop Benjamin T. Onderdonk and Eliza Handy Moscrop. He went to Columbia Grammar & Preparatory School.

Onderdonk went to Trinity School. He began studying law under Joseph Blunt when he was 16. After he was admitted to the bar he stayed in New York City in Blunt's office. In 1846, he moved to Queens County. A Whig, he was elected Queens County District Attorney in 1853 and re-elected to the office in 1856. In 1865, he was elected surrogate of Queens County, and he served in that office until 1870. He resided in Great Neck, but maintained a law office in New York City.

Onderdonk was a member and vestryman of the Christ Episcopal Church in Manhasset. In 1843, he married Harriet S. Mott. Their children were Robert Mott (who died when he was 11) and Edith Vernon.

Onderdonk died at his New York City home on December 11, 1882. He was buried in Christ Church Cemetery in Manhasset.

References

External links 

 William H. Onderdonk at Find a Grave

1820 births
1882 deaths
Queens County (New York) District Attorneys
Columbia Grammar & Preparatory School alumni
Trinity School (New York City) alumni
19th-century American lawyers
New York (state) Whigs
People from Great Neck, New York
People from Manhasset, New York
19th-century American Episcopalians
Burials in New York (state)